was an annual music awards on the produced by Nippon Broadcasting System.

Grand Prix winners 
Akiko Kosaka (1974)
Hiromi Ota (1975)
Hiromi Iwasaki (1975)
Machiko Watanabe (1978)
Mariya Takeuchi (1979)
Toshihiko Tahara (1980)
Masahiko Kondo (1981)
Shibugakitai (1982)
The Good-Bye (1983)
Yukiko Okada (1984)
Noriko Matsumoto (1985)
Shonentai (1986)
Eriko Tamura (1989)
Ninja (1990)

Venues 
1973-1975: Nakano Sun Plaza
1976-1981: Tokyo Takarazuka Theater
1982-1990: Grand Prince Hotel Akasaka

References 
 音楽・芸能賞事典 Nichigai Associates 
 音楽・芸能賞事典 Nichigai Associates 1990/95 

Japanese music awards
Awards established in 1973
Awards disestablished in 1990
1973 establishments in Japan
1990 disestablishments in Japan